
Gmina Świnna is a rural gmina (administrative district) in Żywiec County, Silesian Voivodeship, in southern Poland.

Villages
Gmina Świnna contains the villages and settlements of Pewel Mała, Pewel Ślemieńska, Przyłęków, Rychwałdek, Świnna and Trzebinia.

Neighbouring gminas
Gmina Świnna is bordered by the town of Żywiec and by the gminas of Gilowice, Jeleśnia, Radziechowy-Wieprz and Ślemień.

References

Swinna
Żywiec County